is a prefecture of Japan located in the Kantō region of Honshu. Tochigi Prefecture has a population of 1,943,886 (1 June 2019) and has a geographic area of 6,408 km2 (2,474 sq mi). Tochigi Prefecture borders Fukushima Prefecture to the north, Gunma Prefecture to the west, Saitama Prefecture to the south, and Ibaraki Prefecture to the southeast.

Utsunomiya is the capital and largest city of Tochigi Prefecture, with other major cities including Oyama, Tochigi, and Ashikaga. Tochigi Prefecture is one of only eight landlocked prefectures and its mountainous northern region is a popular tourist region in Japan. The Nasu area is known for its onsens, local sake, and ski resorts, the villa of the Imperial Family, and the  station of the Shinkansen railway line. The city of Nikkō, with its ancient Shintō shrines and Buddhist temples, is a UNESCO World Heritage Site.

Prefectural overview 
Situated among the inland prefectures of the northern part of the Kantō region, Tochigi is contiguous with Ibaraki, Gunma, Saitama, and Fukushima Prefectures.

The climate of Tochigi may be classified as a humid temperate zone with broad variations in temperature. Winters are arid with dry winds, while summers are humid with frequent thunderstorms.

The population of Tochigi as of November 2010 is approximately 2,005,096.

Located in the center of the prefecture is the largest open plain in the Kantō region. Shirane, Nantai and Nasudake mountain are in the northern part of the area. Kinugawa, Nakagawa, and Watarase River originate in this region, which flow across the Kanto plain before emptying into the Pacific Ocean.  Tochigi is the 20th largest prefecture in Japan with a total area of 6,408.09 square km.

As of 1 April 2012, 21% of the total land area of the prefecture was designated as Natural Parks, namely Nikkō National Park, Oze National Park, and eight Prefectural Natural Parks.

History 

Before the Meiji Restoration, Tochigi was known as Shimotsuke Province.

In the early 15th century, the Ashikaga Gakkō, Japan's oldest school of higher education, was re-established in the prefecture, holding over 3,000 students by the 16th century. Saint Francis Xavier introduced Ashikaga to the world as the best university in Japan.

In the early 17th century, Japan was unified under the shōgun Tokugawa Ieyasu. After his death, Tōshō-gū shrine was built in Nikkō on what the shōguns thought of as holy ground to protect and worship Ieyasu. The establishment of the Nikkō Tōshō-gū in 1617 brought Nikkō to national attention.   The Tokugawa shogunate developed the Nikkō Kaidō (日光街道, part of the major road connecting Nikkō with Edo) and acquired lavish processions to worship Ieyasu, the founder of the Tokugawa line of shōguns.

In the late 19th century, the Tokugawa shogunate fell and the new government established the prefectures.  The prefectural capital was established in the city of Tochigi after the unification of Utsunomiya Prefecture and Tochigi Prefecture in 1873. By 1884, however, the capital was transferred to Utsunomiya.

In March 2011, following the Fukushima Daiichi nuclear disaster, levels of radioactivity in Utsunomiya were 33 times higher than normal.

Geography 
The chief city of Utsunomiya is famous for its many gyoza specialist shops. Also located in Utsunomiya, Tochigi Prefecture has one of the largest shopping malls in the North Kantō region, Bell Mall.

Cities

Fourteen cities are located in Tochigi Prefecture:

Ashikaga
Kanuma
Mooka
Nasukarasuyama
Nasushiobara
Nikkō
Ōtawara
Oyama
Sakura
Sano
Shimotsuke
Tochigi
Utsunomiya (capital)
Yaita

Towns

These are the towns in each district:

Haga District
Haga
Ichikai
Mashiko
Motegi
Kawachi District
Kaminokawa
Nasu District
Nakagawa
Nasu
Shimotsuga District
Mibu
Nogi
Shioya District
Shioya
Takanezawa

Mergers

List of governors of Tochigi Prefecture (from 1947)

Industry and agriculture 

Located close to Tōkyō, Tochigi is home to many corporations and industrial zones, including the Kiyohara Industrial Complex, one of the largest inland industrial complexes in the country.

Industrial manufacturing accounts for 36.6% of the prefecture's total output. Vehicle parts and accessories are the primary products, followed by vehicles, radios and televisions, pharmaceuticals, and wireless communication equipment.

Below are goods manufactured in Tochigi with the highest market share in Japan:

(The 2004 industrial analysis report published by the Ministry of Economy, Trade and Industry)

The annual gross agricultural output in Tochigi is about 274 billion yen. Rice, vegetables, and livestock are produced in the region. Tochigi is also known for strawberries, Chinese chives, and Japanese pears sold throughout Japan and exported to other countries.  Approximately 55% of Tochigi is covered by forests.  Mushrooms, such as Shiitake mushrooms, make up half of the forest industry, with an output of approximately 5.6 billion yen.

Education 
Tochigi is home to many universities and colleges including those for science and technology, literature, medicine, education, and art. Below is an alphabetical list of some of the universities located in Tochigi.

 Ashikaga Institute of Technology
 Bunsei University of Art, Utsunomiya
 Dokkyo University School of Medicine, Mibu
 Hakuoh University, Oyama
 International University of Health and Welfare, Otawara
 Jichi Medical University, Shimotsuke
 Oyama National College of Technology
 Sakushin Gakuin University, Utsunomiya
 Sano College
 Teikyo University, Utsunomiya
 Tochigi College of Industry and Technology (Central), Utsunomiya
 Tochigi College of Industry and Technology (North), Nasu
 Tochigi College of Industry and Technology (South), Ashikaga
 Utsunomiya Kyowa University, Utsunomiya and Nasushiobara
 Utsunomiya University

People

Sports  

The sports teams and events listed below are based in Tochigi.

Football (Soccer)
Tochigi S.C. (Utsunomiya)

Ice hockey
Nikkō Ice Bucks (Nikkō)

Basketball
 Utsunomiya Brex

Motorsport
 Twin Ring Motegi circuit
 Nikkō Circuit

Cycling
Tour de Tochigi, a cat 2.2 three-day road race of the UCI Asia Tour

Tourism 
Nikkō National Park is famous for its UNESCO World Heritage Site which was registered as the 10th World Heritage Site in 1999. This encompasses Rinnō-ji, Nikkō Tōshō-gū, Mount Nantai, and Futarasan Shrine. The Kegon Falls, also in Nikkō, is popular with tourists. To travel between the city and the falls, automobiles and buses take the Irohazaka, a road with dozens of switchbacks. In addition, 400-year-old Japanese Cedars (about 13,000 in total) line the famous Cedar Avenue of Nikkō for roughly 35 km, making it the longest tree-lined avenue in the world.

A more recent and modern attraction is the Twin Ring Motegi Circuit race course, which hosts the only IndyCar race outside the United States. The track also hosts many other race events including Formula One and motorcycle races as well as festivals and fireworks events.

Tochigi has many traditional festivals and events such as Nikkō Tōshō-gū's 1000 Samurai Procession and Horseback Archery Festival, and the city of Tochigi's Autumn Festival where doll floats are pulled around the city once every five years.

Other attractions include:
 Nikkō Tōshō-gū
 Rinnō-ji
 Futarasan Shrine
 Kegon Falls
 Lake Chūzenji
 Kirifuri Falls
 Mashiko
 Shiobara Hot Spring
 Nasu resort area
 Kinugawa (hot spring)
 Edo Wonderland Nikko Edomura
 Cannabis Museum

Transportation and access

Roads
Traversing the prefecture along the north–south axis and connecting to the rest of the country are the Tōhoku Expressway and the new and old Route 4. From east to west spans Route 50, connecting southern Tochigi with Ibaraki and Gunma Prefectures.

Also connecting Tochigi, Gunma, and Ibaraki is the Kita-Kantō Expressway, with the 18.5 km that connect the Tochigi-Tsuga Interchange and the Utsunomiya-Kaminokawa Interchange. Portions of the Kita-Kantō Expressway are still being constructed and is set to be fully completed by 2011. The highway will link the region's other main transport arteries, the Tōhoku, the Jōban and the Kan-Etsu Expressways, providing a link to the international port of Hitachinaka in Ibaraki.

Rail

The Tōhoku Shinkansen and the JR Utsunomiya Line are the main railways running north and south in Tochigi. To the east and west, the Mito and Ryōmō Lines connect Tochigi to Ibaraki and Gunma.

Freight is served by the Utsunomiya Freight Terminal.
East Japan Railway Company
Tōhoku Shinkansen
Shōnan-Shinjuku Line
Utsunomiya Line (Tōhoku Main Line)
Nikkō Line
Ryōmō Line
Mito Line
Karasuyama Line
Tobu
Isesaki Line
Nikkō Line
Kinugawa Line
Utsunomiya Line
Sano Line
Mooka Railway
Yagan Railway
Watarase Keikoku Line

Air travel
Fukushima Airport is approximately an hour's drive from Utsunomiya on the Tōhoku Expressway. International and national air transportation is through Narita International Airport to the east of Tokyo, approximately three hours by vehicle from Utsunomiya.

References

Sources 
 Nussbaum, Louis-Frédéric and Käthe Roth (2005). Japan Encyclopedia. Cambridge, Mass.: Harvard University Press. ; .

External links 

 Tochigi Prefecture Official Website 
 Tochigi International Association Website 

 
Kantō region
Prefectures of Japan